Thaddeus of Warsaw is an 1803 novel written by Jane Porter. It comprises four volumes. The story was derived from eyewitness accounts of British soldiers and Polish refugees fleeing the failed revolts against the foreign occupation of Poland in the 1790s. It was thought by Olga S. Phillips (1940), author of Isaac Nathan's biography, that the character of Thaddeus was based on Nathan's father Menachem Mona Polack (Moses Monash the Pole) who was thought to be the illegitimate son of King Stanisław August Poniatowski and his Jewish mistress Elżbieta Szydłowska. Phillips claims that Jane Porter used to call Isaac Nathan 'Thaddeus' when touching his face as a child.

The work is a hybrid: the first third relates developments and battles within Poland, the remainder of the books serve as a novel of manners describing how Thaddeus, having befriended a British soldier in the Russian army and learned from his mother that he himself is half English, flees to London to seek help for his cause among the British. He sells art, falls in love, and finds (and restores the honor of) his long-lost father. Porter wrote that her goal was "to exhibit so truly heroic and enduring a portrait of what every Christian man ought to be"; she felt obliged to look at the past and to Poland because such people were "extinct" within Britain in her time. Written during a lull in the Napoleonic Wars, Thaddeus of Warsaw includes numerous speeches and scenes arguing for a spirited defense of constitutional government against absolutism and criticizes the perceived dilettantism of the English aristocracy.

It went through at least 84 editions, including translations into French and German. The German edition was praised by Tadeusz Kościuszko, the inspiration for the "Thaddeus" of the title and a hero of the American Revolution, and earned Porter a ladyship from the King of Württemberg. The book was responsible for the name of Warsaw, North Carolina (founded ). The character of Thaddeus Sobieski was the namesake of Thaddeus Lowe (b. 1832), the father of aerial reconnaissance in the United States, and Pembroke Somerset was the namesake of Pembroke, Kentucky (est. 1836).  Porter came to be so disregarded that the editor of an 1897 edition of Porter's diary took it for granted that her readers would not have heard of her and a 1905 edition of Thaddeus was published as part of a series on Half-Forgotten Books.

Despite the work's success, Porter was described as "totally destitute or nearly so", was obliged to circulate among her friends as a houseguest, and repeatedly petitioned the government for a literary pension (denied in part because she was unable to gather the support of other important literary figures). This penury arose because the rights to Thaddeus and her other stories were  after protracted litigation  no longer held by Porter but belonged to her various publishers, including Owen Rees, Richard Bentley, and George Virtue. Issuing "improved" and "corrected" versions with prefaces and other errata permitted her to keep some income from works.

References

External links
 Thaddeus of Warsaw at Gutenberg.org

1803 British novels
Fiction set in the 1800s
Novels set in the 18th century
Scottish novels
Historical novels
Polish historical novels